Departure (French: Partir) is a 1931 French drama film directed by Maurice Tourneur and starring Jean Marchat, Simone Cerdan and Ginette d'Yd. It was based on a novel by Roland Dorgelès. An opera singer travelling with her company on a passenger ship for a tour of French Indochina, encounters a mysterious young man who she falls in love with.

Cast
 Jean Marchat as Jacques Largy 
 Simone Cerdan as Florence Bernard 
 Ginette d'Yd as Odette Nicolai 
 Gaby Basset as Carmen 
 Charles Prince as Le comique 
 Fichel as Prater 
 Gaston Mauger as Félix, le directeur 
 Georges Paulais as Le docteur 
 Charles Barrois as Le commissaire de bord 
 Jacques Anderson as Le lieutenant blond 
 Lugné-Poe as Daniel Garrot 
 Hélène Robert as Micaella 
 Christiane Tourneur as Musette 
 Mary Ganesco as Madame Pascalin

References

Bibliography
 Waldman, Harry. Maurice Tourneur: The Life and Films. McFarland, 2008.

External links

1931 films
1931 drama films
French drama films
1930s French-language films
Films directed by Maurice Tourneur
Films based on French novels
Seafaring films
Pathé films
French black-and-white films
1930s French films